Khalajan or khalajan

'Khelejan or Kheljan' may refer to:
 Khelejan, East Azerbaijan
 Khalajan, Kermanshah
 Khalajan, Gavrud, Kermanshah Province